Der Junge, der rennt is the second studio album by German recording artist Max Giesinger. It was released by BMG Rights Management on 8 April 2016 in German-speaking Europe.

Track listing
Credits adapted from the liner notes of Der Junge, der rennt.

Charts

Weekly charts

Year-end charts

Certifications

References

External links 
  Official website

2016 albums
Max Giesinger albums